Karl Käser also spelled as Carl Kaeser  (22 April 1874 – 16 August 1904) was a German track cyclist who competed between 1896 and 1904 in all track cycling disciplines.

Käser participated mainly in track cycling races in Germany but also competed internationally, including in the United States in the 1900 six-day race of New York. He competed for Germany in the professional/non-medal classification at the 1900 Summer Olympics 	in three separate events - the sprint, the tandem sprint, and the 3,000 metres.
Käser was also the pacemaker of the Swiss cyclist Edmond Audemars, World Champion at the 1903 UCI Track Cycling World Championships.

Käser died as a result of a fall during a paced race between himself and Thaddeus Robl at the Plauen track in Saxony, Germany in August 1904. He was utilizing a 24-inch tire on a 22-inch wheel and in the moments before his fatal accident he had just pushed back his safety helmet.

Notes

References

See also
List of racing cyclists and pacemakers with a cycling-related death

1874 births
1904 deaths
German male cyclists
Cyclists from Baden-Württemberg
Sport deaths in Germany
Cyclists who died while racing
People from Waldshut (district)
Sportspeople from Freiburg (region)